Dragnet Nation: A quest for privacy, security, and freedom in a world of relentless surveillance is a 2014 book on Computer and network surveillance by Julia Angwin. Angwin said that she was motivated to write the book when she learned of data scraping.

Reception
Various commentators have reviewed the book. It has received generally good reviews.

References

External links

video interview of the author and Bill Moyers

Works about privacy
2014 non-fiction books
Times Books books